Mamadou Gueye (born 15 March 1986) is a Senegalese athlete competing in the long jump and triple jump. He won the bronze medal at the 2015 African Games.

Competition record

Personal bests
Outdoor
Long jump – 7.86 (Saint-Louis, SEN 2015)
Triple jump – 16.50 (Saint-Louis, SEN 2015)
Indoor
60 metres – 7.19
200 metres – 23.34
Long jump – 7.83 (New York 2013)
Triple jump – 16.17 (New York 2013)

References

1986 births
Living people
Senegalese male long jumpers
Senegalese male triple jumpers
Athletes (track and field) at the 2015 African Games
African Games silver medalists for Senegal
African Games medalists in athletics (track and field)
Senegalese expatriates in the United States
Competitors at the 2009 Summer Universiade
Competitors at the 2011 Summer Universiade
Competitors at the 2013 Summer Universiade
20th-century Senegalese people
21st-century Senegalese people